Silverdale is an unincorporated community in Koochiching County, Minnesota, United States; located in the southeast corner of the county.

The community is located between Orr and Togo at the junction of State Highway 65 (MN 65) and County Road 74.

Silverdale is located within ZIP code 55771 based in Orr.  The boundary line between Koochiching and Saint Louis counties is nearby.

The Little Fork River flows through the area.  The Willow River, a tributary of the Little Fork River, is also nearby.

Geography
Silverdale is located on the edge of the Koochiching State Forest.  The community is located within South Koochiching Unorganized Territory.

Nearby places include Rauch, Greaney, Nett Lake, and Orr.

The community consists of Township 63 of Range 22 and 23; and the northern sections of Township 64 of Range 22 and 23.

References

 Rand McNally Road Atlas – 2007 edition – Minnesota entry
 Official State of Minnesota Highway Map – 2011/2012 edition
 Mn/DOT map of Koochiching County – Sheet 2 – 2011 edition

External links
 SilverdaleMN.com – Community website

Unincorporated communities in Minnesota
Unincorporated communities in Koochiching County, Minnesota